Brigham Young (1801–1877), second president of the Church of Jesus Christ of Latter-day Saints (LDS Church), was perhaps the most famous polygamist of the early Latter Day Saint movement, marrying a total of fifty-six wives during his lifetime. He stated that upon being taught about plural marriage by Joseph Smith, "It was the first time in my life that I desired the grave." By the time of his death, Young had fifty-seven children by sixteen of his wives; forty-six of his children reached adulthood. In 1902, only 25 years after Young's death, The New York Times established that Young's direct descendants numbered more than 1,000.

Wives and family

Sources have varied on the number of Young's wives due to differences in what observers have considered to be a "wife". It has been confirmed that here were fifty-six women that Young was sealed to during his lifetime. While the majority of the sealings were "for eternity" (i.e., in the afterlife), some were "for time only" (until death). In both of these types of sealings, a conjugal relationship could exist, though Young did not enter into conjugal relationships with all of his wives. Young did not live with a number of his wives or publicly hold them out as wives, which has led to confusion on numbering.  A book published in 1887 gives brief biographical sketches and photos of a total of twenty-six wives.

Of his fifty-six wives, twenty-one had never been married before; seventeen were widows; six were divorced; six had living husbands; and the marital status of six others is unknown. Nine of his wives had previously been plural wives of Joseph Smith, and Young was sealed to them as a proxy for Smith.

Four of his wives were sealed to him during Smith's lifetime, sixteen after Smith's death but before the completion of the Nauvoo Temple, nineteen in the Nauvoo Temple, four during his journey from Nauvoo to the Salt Lake Valley, and eleven in Utah.

At the time of Young's death, twenty of his wives had predeceased him, he was divorced from ten, and twenty-three survived him, with the status of four unknown. In his will, Young shared his estate with the seventeen surviving wives who had lived with him; the six surviving non-conjugal wives were not mentioned in the will. A number of women were sealed to him posthumously, but this number is also highly debated, as various sealing records from this time are incomplete or missing.

Public image 
During Young's lifetime, there was a lot of public speculation as to the total number of his wives and children. Estimates in newspapers ranged anywhere from forty to two hundred, and Young often refrained to comment on these estimates, whether to confirm or deny them. Artemus Ward, a well-known comedian at the time, shared a speculation of his own after a journey to Utah: "I have somewhere stated that Brigham Young is said to have eighty wives. I hardly think he has so many... I undertook to count his long stockings on the clothes-line in the back yard, one day, and I used up the multiplication table in less than half an hour."

Eighteen of Young's wives and their children traveled to Utah with the Brigham Young Company in 1848. Young would often attend cultural events and public gatherings with his wives, usually only one, and his children. Near the end of his life, Amelia Folsom (m. 1863) would become his most significant female companion, and would often accompany Young to dances and to the theater, as well as on tours of the Mormon settlements. He was a very prominent public figure in Utah, as well as in other Mormon communities, and thought it very important for himself and his family to be well-educated in the arts and culture. Young wanted to make his home a model which others could emulate, and is reported by his children to have been a loving, caring, and concerned husband and father.

Living arrangements

In 1856, Young built the Lion House to accommodate his sizable family. This building remains a Salt Lake City landmark, together with the Beehive House, another Brigham Young family home built in 1854. Young primarily resided in the Beehive House with his wife Mary Ann Angel, but would gather together the entire family each evening at the Lion House for prayer and dinner. Angell later chose to move into the nearby White House sometime after 1860. Before Young's death he also had the Gardo House built as a guest house across the street from the others, which would have Amelia Folsom (m. 1863) as its primary resident. The Young household also had various servants, including the adopted Bannock girl Sally Young Kanosh, and Isaac and Jane Manning James. A contemporary of Young wrote: "It was amusing to walk by Brigham Young's big house, a long rambling building with innumerable doors. Each wife has an establishment of her own, consisting of parlor, bedroom, and a front door, the key of which she keeps in her pocket".

Within the Young household there was an arranged cooperative effort among the wives and children. Many wives served in particular roles, such as Zina Huntington (m. 1846), who served as the family's midwife, and Naamah Carter (m. 1846), who took charge of the Lion House family meals. Young's children were taught in the basement of the Lion House by Harriet Cook (m. 1843), until the construction of Young's own schoolhouse in 1865 and the subsequent hiring of a full-time teacher. Young also maintained a recreation room outfitted with a stage for variety shows and theatrical productions, as well as a long porch to serve as a gymnasium. He kept teachers in order to instruct the children in physical activities such as fencing, gymnastics, and dance. A family swimming pool was also constructed east of the Beehive House, which was occasionally used for baptisms.

Chart of wives 
List of women whose sealings to Young have been confirmed with evidence.

Disputed wives 
Various women have been listed in published accounts as being sealed to Young, though there is no evidence confirming their sealings. While some could possibly have been his wives and merely lack conclusive evidence to be proven as such, other claims have been completely disproven.

 Nancy Chamberlain, who Ann Eliza Webb claimed was one of Young's wives during one of her anti-Mormon lectures.
 Amanda Barnes, who was sealed to Joseph Smith in January 1852 with Young acting as a proxy. 
 Charlotte Cobb, daughter of Augusta Adams Cobb (m. 1843)
 Mina A. Cook, listed in the 1860 census record as belonging to the Young household. No other information is provided to determine marital status.  
 Susan Taffindor, listed in the 1860 census record as belonging to the Young household. No other information is provided to determine marital status.  
 Eliza Y. Young, listed in the 1860 census record as belonging to the Young household. No other information is provided to determine marital status.  
 Margaret G., reported by an apostate Mormon Samuel Hawthornthwaite as being married to Young. Given the lack of surname for Margaret, investigation becomes difficult. 
 Talula Gibson, daughter of Walter Murray Gibson and was listed in the 1860 census as belonging to the Young household. No marriage record has been found. 
 Eleanor Jane McComb McLean, one of the twelve wives of Parley P. Pratt, who lived for a time at the Lion House. 
 Sarah Ann McDonal, married a man named Brigham Jonathan Young from England, who scholars have mistaken as being Brigham Young. 
 Two Sioux women, a rumor that was spread in a 1852 anti-Mormon polemic by William Hall.
 Jane Watt, wife and half sister of George D. Watt, rumored to have been married to Young.

See also 

 Descendants of Brigham Young
 List of Latter Day Saint practitioners of plural marriage
 List of Joseph Smith's wives

References

External links

 List of Brigham Young's wives on familysearch.org
 Young Family Genealogy. MSS SC 981; Young Family genealogy; 20th Century Western and Mormon Manuscripts; L. Tom Perry Special Collections, Harold B. Lee Library, Brigham Young University.
Brigham Young's Wives, Children, and Grandchildren. MSS SC 1995; 20th Century Western and Mormon Manuscripts; L. Tom Perry Special Collections, Harold B. Lee Library, Brigham Young University. 
*Wives of Brigham Young. MSS 664; 20th Century Western & Mormon Manuscripts; L. Tom Perry Special Collections, Harold B. Lee Library, Brigham Young University.

 
Young, wives
Brigham Young's Wives
Mormonism and polygamy
List of Brigham Young's wives
19th-century Mormonism
Lists of 19th-century people
Lists of wives
Young, Brigham wives
Harold B. Lee Library-related 19th century articles